Duden is a German surname. Notable people with the surname include:

Bob Duden (1920–1995), American golfer
Dick Duden (1924–2013), American football player
Gottfried Duden (1789–1856), German writer
Konrad Duden (1829–1911), German philologist and lexicographer

German-language surnames